In quantum mechanics, spin is an intrinsic property of all elementary particles. The spin number describes how many symmetrical facets a particle has in one full rotation; a spin of  means that the particle must be rotated by two full turns (through 720°) before it has the same configuration as when it started.

Particles having net spin  include the proton, neutron, electron, neutrino, and quarks. The dynamics of spin- objects cannot be accurately described using classical physics; they are among the simplest systems which require quantum mechanics to describe them.  As such, the study of the behavior of spin- systems forms a central part of quantum mechanics.

Stern–Gerlach experiment 

The necessity of introducing half-integer spin goes back experimentally to the results of the Stern–Gerlach experiment. A beam of atoms is run through a strong heterogeneous magnetic field, which then splits into N parts depending on the intrinsic angular momentum of the atoms. It was found that for silver atoms, the beam was split in two—the ground state therefore could not be an integer, because even if the intrinsic angular momentum of the atoms were the smallest (non-zero) integer possible, 1, the beam would be split into 3 parts, corresponding to atoms with Lz = −1, +1, and 0, with 0 simply being the value known to come between -1 and +1 while also being a whole-integer itself, and thus a valid quantized spin number in this case. The existence of this hypothetical "extra step" between the two polarized quantum states would necessitate a third quantum state; a third beam, which is not observed in the experiment.

General properties 

Spin- objects are all fermions (a fact explained by the spin–statistics theorem) and satisfy the Pauli exclusion principle.  Spin- particles can have a permanent magnetic moment along the direction of their spin, and this magnetic moment gives rise to electromagnetic interactions that depend on the spin.  One such effect that was important in the discovery of spin is the Zeeman effect, the splitting of a spectral line into several components in the presence of a static magnetic field.

Unlike in more complicated quantum mechanical systems, the spin of a spin- particle can be expressed as a linear combination of just two eigenstates, or eigenspinors. These are traditionally labeled spin up and spin down.  Because of this, the quantum-mechanical spin operators can be represented as simple 2 × 2 matrices. These matrices are called the Pauli matrices.

Creation and annihilation operators can be constructed for spin- objects; these obey the same commutation relations as other angular momentum operators.

Connection to the uncertainty principle 

One consequence of the generalized uncertainty principle is that the spin projection operators (which measure the spin along a given direction like x, y, or z) cannot be measured simultaneously.  Physically, this means that the axis about which a particle is spinning is ill-defined. A measurement of the z-component of spin destroys any information about the x- and y-components that might previously have been obtained.

Mathematical description
In solutions of the Schrödinger equation, angular momentum is quantized according to this number, so that total spin angular momentum

Note that these values for angular momentum are functions only of the reduced Planck constant (the angular momentum of any photon), with no dependence on mass or charge.

Complex phase 

Mathematically, quantum mechanical spin is not described by a vector as in classical angular momentum. It is described by a complex-valued vector with two components called a spinor. There are subtle differences between the behavior of spinors and vectors under coordinate rotations, stemming from the behavior of a vector space over a complex field.

When a spinor is rotated by 360° (one full turn), it transforms to its negative, and then after a further rotation of 360° it transforms back to its initial value again. This is because in quantum theory the state of a particle or system is represented by a complex probability amplitude (wavefunction) ψ, and when the system is measured, the probability of finding the system in the state ψ equals , the absolute square (square of the absolute value) of the amplitude. In mathematical terms, the quantum Hilbert space carries a projective representation of the rotation group SO(3).

Suppose a detector that can be rotated measures a particle in which the probabilities of detecting some state are affected by the rotation of the detector. When the system is rotated through 360°, the observed output and physics are the same as initially but the amplitudes are changed for a spin- particle by a factor of −1 or a phase shift of half of 360°. When the probabilities are calculated, the −1 is squared, (−1)2 =  1, so the predicted physics is the same as in the starting position. Also, in a spin- particle there are only two spin states and the amplitudes for both change by the same −1 factor, so the interference effects are identical, unlike the case for higher spins. The complex probability amplitudes are something of a theoretical construct which cannot be directly observed.

If the probability amplitudes rotated by the same amount as the detector, then they would have changed by a factor of −1 when the equipment was rotated by 180° which when squared would predict the same output as at the start, but experiments show this to be wrong. If the detector is rotated by 180°, the result with spin- particles can be different from what it would be if not rotated, hence the factor of a half is necessary to make the predictions of the theory match the experiments.

In terms of more direct evidence, physical effects of the difference between the rotation of a spin- particle by 360° as compared with 720° have been experimentally observed in classic experiments  in neutron interferometry. In particular, if a beam of spin-oriented spin- particles is split, and just one of the beams is rotated about the axis of its direction of motion and then recombined with the original beam, different interference effects are observed depending on the angle of rotation. In the case of rotation by 360°,  cancellation effects are observed, whereas in the case of rotation by 720°,  the beams are mutually reinforcing.

NRQM (non-relativistic quantum mechanics)
The quantum state of a spin- particle can be described by a two-component complex-valued vector called a spinor. Observable states of the particle are then found by the spin operators Sx, Sy, and Sz, and the total spin operator S.

Observables

For example, the spin projection operator Sz affects a measurement of the spin in the z direction.

The two eigenvalues of Sz, then correspond to the following eigenspinors:

These vectors form a complete basis for the Hilbert space describing the spin- particle.  Thus, linear combinations of these two states can represent all possible states of the spin, including in the x- and y-directions.

The ladder operators are:

Thus:

Their normalized eigenspinors can be found in the usual way. For Sx, they are:

For Sy, they are:

RQM (relativistic quantum mechanics)
While NRQM defines spin  with 2 dimensions in Hilbert space with dynamics that are described in 3-dimensional space and time, relativistic quantum mechanics defines the spin with 4 dimensions in Hilbert space and dynamics described by 4-dimensional space-time.

Observables
As a consequence of the four-dimensional nature of space-time in relativity, relativistic quantum mechanics uses 4×4 matrices to describe spin operators and observables.

Spin as a consequence of combining quantum theory and special relativity

When physicist Paul Dirac tried to modify the Schrödinger equation so that it was consistent with Einstein's theory of relativity, he found it was only possible by including matrices in the resulting Dirac equation, implying the wave must have multiple components leading to spin.

See also
Projective representation

Notes

Further reading

External links

Rotation in three dimensions
Quantum models